Harland & Wolff Welders Football Club is a semi-professional, Northern Irish football club playing in the NIFL Championship.

History
The club, founded in 1965, hails from Belfast and played its home matches at Tillysburn Park in the East of the city. In October 2021 the H&W Welders moved from Tillysburn park into a redevelopment of Blanchflower Park Stadium costing over £5m with 3G pitches and new stands. A new stadium and facilities in the Danny Blanchflower Playing Fields was under construction by 2020, suitable for Premiership football.

The club was formed by the welders of the nearby Harland & Wolff shipyard. The club's colours are amber and black to display the link with Harland & Wolff shipyard and its cranes. Harland & Wolff Welders share a long running rivalry with fellow East Belfast Championship 1 side Dundela. In April 2014 they formed a partnership with Harland Youth, a young club composed of six teams of all ages and they will now be called H&W Welders Youth.

Current squad

Honours

Intermediate honours
Irish Intermediate Cup: 2
2002–03, 2006–07
B Division Knock-out Cup: 3
1997–98, 2000–01, 2001–02
Steel & Sons Cup: 2
2010–11, 2015–16
IFA Championship 2 (level 3): 1
2009–10
IFA Championship 2 League Cup: 1
2009–10
IFA Interim Intermediate League: 1
2008–09
IFA Interim Intermediate League Cup: 1
2008–09
George Wilson Cup: 1
2017–18*
Northern Amateur Football League: 1
1978–79
Clarence Cup: 1
1968–69†

† Won by Harland & Wolff Welders "A"
* Won by Harland & Wolff Welders U20

References

Association football clubs established in 1965
NIFL Championship clubs
Association football clubs in Belfast
1965 establishments in Northern Ireland
Association football clubs in Northern Ireland
Works association football teams in Northern Ireland